Alan Edward Gorrie (born 19 July 1946 in Perth) is a Scottish bassist, guitarist, keyboardist and singer. He is a founding member of the Average White Band and remains one of two original members in the group's current line-up (Onnie McIntyre being the other).

History

Having previously played in Forever More, Gorrie and Owen "Onnie" McIntyre formed the Average White Band in London in 1971. They became a successful funk/R&B group, topping record charts internationally with the AWB album and "Pick Up the Pieces" single.  

As part of Forever More, Gorrie appeared in Lindsay Shonteff's 1970 exploitation film Permissive, and also composed the scores for Shonteff's films The Yes Girls (1971) and The Fast Kill (1972).

Solo discography
Sleepless Nights (1985)

References

1946 births
Living people
Alumni of the University of Dundee
Musicians from Perth, Scotland
Scottish bass guitarists
Average White Band members
Scottish soul singers